The 1915 Guilford Quakers football team represented Guilford College as an independent during the 1915 college football season. The team was coached by Professor William E. Moore, an English teacher who started work at the school that same year.

The short schedule of non-collegiate games was seen as an exciting first step back towards intercollegiate athletics at Guilford, which had not fielded such a football team since 1904.  Despite this, the season has been largely overlooked by even contemporary sportswriters of the time, who focused more on the fact that Guilford's 1917 season was their first season of full intercollegiate play, with a summary of recent football in the 1918 yearbook The Quaker failing to even mention the season; the season was similarly ignored in a 1917 article chronicling the close of their season, which noted that the team competed "on the gridiron for the first time in 13 years".

The team was organized on October 1, 1915, fairly late in the season; by this time, most collegiate teams had already organized and planned their schedule for the year.  Combined with their lack of a recent team, the short and informal schedule makes sense.

Schedule

References

Guilford
Guilford Quakers football seasons
Guilford Quakers football